Thelaira is a genus of bristle flies in the family Tachinidae.

Species

Thelaira altoplani Speiser, 1914
Thelaira americana Brooks, 1945
Thelaira aurofasciata Emden, 1960
Thelaira australis (Walker, 1853)
Thelaira bifasciata Robineau-Desvoidy, 1830
Thelaira bryanti Curran, 1925
Thelaira chrysopruinosa Chao & Shi, 1985
Thelaira claritriangla Zhao & Zhou, 1993
Thelaira ghanii Mesnil, 1968
Thelaira haematodes (Meigen, 1824)
Thelaira hohxilica Chao & Zhou, 1996
Thelaira leucozona (Panzer, 1809)
Thelaira luteiventris Emden, 1960
Thelaira macropus (Wiedemann, 1830)
Thelaira madecassa Mesnil, 1978
Thelaira medvedevi Richter, 2004
Thelaira nigripes (Fabricius, 1794)
Thelaira occelaris Chao & Shi, 1985
Thelaira solivaga (Harris, 1780)
Thelaira sumatrana Townsend, 1927

References

Diptera of Europe
Diptera of Australasia
Diptera of Africa
Diptera of Asia
Diptera of North America
Dexiinae
Tachinidae genera
Taxa named by Jean-Baptiste Robineau-Desvoidy